Schileykula is a genus of air-breathing land snails, terrestrial pulmonate gastropod mollusks in the family Orculidae. All of the species and subspecies in this genus inhabit Turkey, with the exception of the subspecies Schileykula scyphus crass (Pilsbry, 1922), which lives in Iran.

Species belonging to the genera Schileykula and Orculella are indistinguishable based on shell characters only. They differ however in the genitalia, primarily in the presence (Orculella) or absence (Schileykula) of a penial appendix.
In Sch. batumensis and Sch. trapezensis the reproductive isolation is incomplete.

Species and subspecies
Species and subspecies belonging to Schileykula<ref name="Hausdorf 1996">Hausdorf, B. (1996). "Die Orculidae Asiens (Gastropoda: Stylommatophora) (Mousson 1856) (Gastropoda, Pulmonata, Clausiliidae, Phaedusinae)"]. Archiv für Molluskenkunde 125 (1/2): 1-86.</ref> include:
 
 Schileykula aculeata E. Gittenberger & Menkhorst, 1993
 Schileykula attilae Páll-Gergely, 2010
 Schileykula batumensis (Retowski, 1889)
 Schileykula inversa Schütt, 1993
 Schileykula nordsiecki Hausdorf, 1996
 Schileykula (?) robusta (Nägele, 1910)
 Schileykula scyphus (L. Pfeiffer, 1848)
 Schileykula scyphus cilicica Hausdorf, 1996
 Schileykula scyphus crassa (Pilsbry, 1922)
 Schileykula scyphus enteroplax (Pilsbry, 1922)
 Schileykula scyphus erecta Hausdorf, 1996
 Schileykula scyphus lycaonica Hausdorf, 1996
 Schileykula scyphus scyphus (L. Pfeiffer, 1848)
 Schileykula sigma Hausdorf, 1996
 Schileykula trapezensis (Stojaspal, 1981)
 Schileykula trapezensis acampsis Hausdorf, 1996
 Schileykula trapezensis contraria Neubert, 1993
 Schileykula trapezensis neuberti Hausdorf, 1996
 Schileykula trapezensis trapezensis'' (Stojaspal, 1981)

References

Orculidae